Kwa Sani Local Municipality was an administrative area in the Harry Gwala of KwaZulu-Natal in South Africa.

Kwa Sani is an isiZulu name. "Kwa" means "at" and "Sani" means "San people". The name was chosen because it was easy to pronounce for overseas visitors to the World Heritage Site of uKhahlamba.

After the municipal elections on 3 August 2016 it was merged with Ingwe Local Municipality into the new Dr Nkosazana Dlamini Zuma Local Municipality.

Main places
The 2001 census divided the municipality into the following main places:

Politics 
The municipal council consisted of seven members elected by mixed-member proportional representation. Four councillors were elected by first-past-the-post voting in four wards, while the remaining three were chosen from party lists so that the total number of party representatives was proportional to the number of votes received. In the election of 18 May 2011 the African National Congress (ANC) won a majority of five seats on the council.
The following table shows the results of the election.

References

External links
 http://www.kwasani.co.za/

Former local municipalities of South Africa